Salakati, is a census town in Kokrajhar district in the Indian state of Assam. Salakati is 14km away in the north east direction from Kokrajhar.

Demographics
 India census, Salakati had a population of 6772. Males constitute 55% of the population and females 45%. Salakati has an average literacy rate of 66%, higher than the national average of 59.5%: male literacy is 74%, and female literacy is 56%. In Salakati, 13% of the population is under 6 years of age.

Transport
Salakati Railway Station serves the town of Salakati, Kokrajhar district, Assam. This railway station lies under Alipurduar railway division of Northeast Frontier Railway Zone.

Others
State Bank of India has a branch at Salakati.
NTPC Limited has a Thermal Power Project at Salakati known as NTPC Bongaigaon.
LPG DISTRIBUTOR M/S Adarsh Indane Gramin Vitrak.
Assam Garmin Vikash Bank has a branch at Salakati Bazar.

References

Cities and towns in Kokrajhar district
Kokrajhar